, also known as Tsurumaru Castle, was a Japanese castle located in Kagoshima, Kagoshima Prefecture.

History
Kagoshima Castle was constructed in 1601 by Matsudaira Iehisa, head of the Shimazu clan and the first daimyō of the Satsuma Domain, during the early Edo period. A year earlier, Iehisa's father Shimazu Yoshihiro, one of the daimyō of the western alliance opposed to Tokugawa Ieyasu, was defeated at the Battle of Sekigahara. The castle was built shortly after the defeat and in the severe political tension with Ieyasu. Kagoshima Castle is notable for the small scale and fairly poor quality as a main castle of one of the richest domains in Japan. It is said that Shimazu was afraid of giving the Tokugawa an excuse to attack Shimazu territory by making too large a castle.

Kagoshima Castle was destroyed in a fire in 1874 and not rebuilt, and is now only ruins with only the castle's moats and stone walls remaining. Otemon Gate was reconstructed in 2018. Reimeikan, Kagoshima Prefectural Center for Historical Material is located on the site.

Access
Kagoshima Station of Kagoshima Main Line

Literature

References

Castles in Kagoshima Prefecture
Kagoshima Castle
Shimazu clan
Former castles in Japan
Ruined castles in Japan